Canalispira fallax is a species of sea snail, a marine gastropod mollusk, in the family Cystiscidae.

References

fallax
Gastropods described in 1903